The Late Show Band is a band originally founded and led by American musician Jon Batiste as Stay Human. They became the house band for Stephen Colbert's late-night talk show The Late Show with Stephen Colbert on September 8, 2015. When Batiste departed the show on August 12, 2022, Louis Cato became the new bandleader and Stay Human was renamed The Late Show Band, a change that took effect on September 6, 2022.

History

Jon Batiste met fellow musicians Joe Saylor and Phil Kuehn in 2004 while attending The Juilliard School. Batiste began performing in New York City in 2005 with Saylor and Kuehn as a trio with Kuehn on bass and Saylor on drums. They were joined by two more musicians: Eddie Barbash on alto saxophone and Ibanda Ruhumbika on tuba. They then became known as Stay Human. In 2013, they released their first full-length album, Social Music, through Razor & Tie along with the single "Express Yourself," co-written and produced with Austin Bis.

On June 4, 2015, Stephen Colbert announced on his YouTube channel that Stay Human and its bandleader would be the house band for The Late Show with Stephen Colbert. Batiste and Stay Human's "stirring" 2014 performance of "Express Yourself" on Colbert's previous TV show, The Colbert Report, was the basis for Colbert's decision to name Batiste as bandleader on The Late Show. At this time Batiste also invited multi-instrumentalist Louis Cato to join the band.

In February 2016, the band released an album entitled The Late Show EP.

On April 22, 2017, Batiste and Stay Human played for the March for Science rally at the Washington Monument in Washington D.C. In the mission statement for the March for Science it states, "The March for Science champions robustly funded and publicly communicated science as a pillar of human freedom and prosperity."

During the COVID-19 pandemic in 2020–2021, the band was introduced as "Jon Batiste and Stay Home-in", as they recorded their musical segments from home.

On August 12, 2022, Stephen Colbert announced that Jon Batiste was leaving The Late Show to focus on his solo career. The band was renamed The Late Show Band, with Cato promoted to band leader. The change took effect on September 6.

Members
 Louis Cato (electric and acoustic guitar, banjo, bass, drums, percussion, trombone, tuba, vocals)
 Joe Saylor (drums, vocals)
 Nêgah Santos (percussion, vocals)
 Endea Owens (bass, vocals)
 Louis Fouché (saxophone, vocals)
 Jon Lampley (trumpet, tuba, vocals)

Former members
 Jon Batiste (piano, melodica, vocals)
 Eddie Barbash (alto saxophone)
Grace Kelly (saxophonist)
 Phil Kuehn (bass)
 Maddie Rice (electric and acoustic guitar), now with the Saturday Night Live Band.
 Ibanda Ruhumbika (tuba, trombone)
 Michael Thurber (bass)

References

American rhythm and blues musical groups
Radio and television house bands
Musical groups established in 2004
The Late Show with Stephen Colbert